Linifanib (ABT-869) is a structurally novel, potent inhibitor of receptor tyrosine kinases (RTK), vascular endothelial growth factor (VEGF) and platelet-derived growth factor (PDGF) with IC50 of 0.2, 2, 4, and 7 nM for human endothelial cells, PDGF receptor beta (PDGFR-β), KDR, and colony stimulating factor 1 receptor (CSF-1R), respectively. It has much less activity (IC50s > 1 μM) against unrelated RTKs, soluble tyrosine kinases, or serine/threonine kinases. In vivo linifanib is effective orally in mechanism-based murine models of VEGF-induced uterine edema (ED50 = 0.5 mg/kg) and corneal angiogenesis (>50%inhibition, 15 mg/kg).

References 

Tyrosine kinase inhibitors
Ureas
Experimental cancer drugs